Athetesis is a genus of beetles in the family Cerambycidae, containing the following species:

 Athetesis angulicollis (Zajciw, 1961)
 Athetesis prolixa Bates, 1870

References

Trachyderini